The Council of Europe Action Plan for the Republic of Moldova may refer to:

The Council of Europe Action Plan for the Republic of Moldova 2013–2016
The Council of Europe Action Plan for the Republic of Moldova 2017–2020
The Council of Europe Action Plan for the Republic of Moldova 2021–2024